Dascălu is a commune in Ilfov County, Muntenia, Romania. It is composed of four villages: Creața, Dascălu, Gagu and Runcu. Its name is derived from an obsolete Romanian word for "teacher".

The Mostiștea river has its source in Gagu village.

References

Communes in Ilfov County
Localities in Muntenia